Allensford  is a small country park and hamlet in County Durham, in England. It is situated a short distance to the west of Consett, and to the east of Castleside on the River Derwent.

First recorded as Aleynforth in Bishop Hatfield's survey of c. 1382. The placename is sometimes listed as Allansford, "At Allansford...is a bridge over the Derwent into Northumberland, surrounded by some of the most beautiful scenery on that stream; there are a few cottages on each side of the river".

It is uncertain when a bridge replaced the ford, however a bridge was in existence in the late 17th century when the structure was in a "very ruinous and in greate decay” according to the Northumberland Quarter Sessions for 1687–1697.

Allensford Mill farmhouse was originally called the Belsay Castle Inn, named after the estate of the Middleton family of Belsay Castle.  Part of the inn was built in the late 17th century and may have been a bastle. Later additions continued throughout the 18th and 19th centuries. The inn was licensed until 1869. The upper room in the outbuilding served as a nonconformist chapel.

Denis Hayford, (c.1635–1733), a pioneer of the steel industry, acquired the lease of Allensford furnace and forge in 1692 which was upstream from his established business in Shotley Bridge.  The lease seems to have lapsed in 1713. The site of the furnace is marked on Ordnance Survey maps.

It has a dedicated campsite. The adjacent woodland forms the Allensford Woods Local Nature Reserve, covering .

References

External links
 Tommy Craggs local chainsaw carver, creates nature trail

Villages in County Durham
Local Nature Reserves in County Durham